This article contains information about the literary events and publications of 1837.

Events
June 16 – Charles Dickens is introduced to the actor William Macready by John Forster backstage at a rehearsal of Othello.
July – The English "peasant poet" John Clare first enters an asylum for the insane, at High Beach in Essex.
September – In Burton's Gentleman's Magazine (Philadelphia), William Evans Burton publishes an early example of the detective story, "The Secret Cell", featuring a London police officer and his wife.
October – The United States Magazine and Democratic Review is first published.
October 4 – Andreas Munch's first play, Kong Sverres Ungdom, opens the Christiania Theatre's new building in Norway.
unknown date – The publishers Little, Brown and Company open their doors in Boston, Massachusetts.

New books

Fiction
W. Harrison Ainsworth – Crichton
Honoré de Balzac
César Birotteau
Lost Illusions, Part I: The Two Poets
Richard Harris Barham – The Ingoldsby Legends (serialization begins in Bentley's Miscellany)
Robert Montgomery Bird – Nick of the Woods
Sara Coleridge – Phantasmion
Hendrik Conscience – In 't Wonderjaar 1566
Charles Dickens
Oliver Twist (serialization begins in Bentley's Miscellany, February)
The Pickwick Papers (serialization completed in November; first book publication)
Benjamin Disraeli
Henrietta Temple
Venetia
Lady Mary Fox – An Account of an Expedition to the Interior of New Holland
Phillipe-Ignace François Aubert du Gaspé – L'Influence d'un livre
Jeremias Gotthelf – Bauernspiegel
Nathaniel Hawthorne – Twice-Told Tales
Julia Kavanagh – Adele
Letitia Elizabeth Landon (writing as L.E.L.) – Ethel Churchill, or The Two Brides
Catharine Maria Sedgwick – Live and Let Live
Victor Séjour – Le Mulâtre (earliest known work of African American fiction, published in Revue des Colonies, March)
Mary Shelley – Falkner

Children and young people
Hans Christian Andersen
Fairy Tales Told for Children. First Collection. Third Booklet (Eventyr, fortalte for Børn. Første Samling. Tredie Hefte) comprising "The Little Mermaid" ("Den lille havfrue") and "The Emperor's New Clothes" ("Kejserens nye klæder")
Only a Fiddler
Georgiana Chatterton – Aunt Dorothy's Tales
Frederick Marryat – Snarleyyow or the Dog Fiend
George Ayliffe Poole – The Exile's Return; or a Cat's Journey from Glasgow to Edinburgh
Robert Southey – "The Story of the Three Bears" (in The Doctor)

Drama
Joanna Baillie – The Separation
Manuel Bretón de los Herreros – Muérete y verás
Robert Browning – Strafford
Edward Bulwer-Lytton – The Duchess de la Vallière
Juan Eugenio Hartzenbusch – Los Amantes de Teruel
Henrik Hertz – Svend Dyrings Huus
James Sheridan Knowles 
 The Bridal
 The Love Chase
Alfred de Musset – Un caprice
Jules-Édouard Alboize de Pujol – L'Idiote

Poetry
José de Espronceda – El estudiante de Salamanca
Louisa Jane Hall – Miriam, a Dramatic Sketch (written 1826)
Alphonse de Lamartine – Chute d'un ange
Alexander Pushkin – The Bronze Horseman (Медный всадник)
See also 1837 in poetry

Non-fiction
Charles Babbage – Ninth Bridgewater Treatise. On the Power, Wisdom and Goodness of God, as manifested in the Creation
Charles Ball – Slavery in the United States: A Narrative of the Life and Adventures of Charles Ball, A Black Man
Bernard Bolzano – Wissenschaftslehre (Theory of Science)
Thomas Carlyle – The French Revolution: A History
Washington Irving – The Adventures of Captain Bonneville
Harriet Martineau – Society in America
William H. Prescott – The History of Ferdinand and Isabella
Ferenc Pulszky – Aus dem Tagebuch eines in Grossbritannien reisenden Ungarns (From the Diary of a Hungarian Travelling in Britain)
Martin Tupper – Proverbial Philosophy
Andrew Ure – A Dictionary of Arts, Manufactures and Mines
Adelbert von Chamisso – Über die Hawaiische Sprache (On the Hawaiian Language)

Births
January 16 – Ellen Russell Emerson, American author and ethnologist  (died 1907)
January 23 – Agnes Maule Machar, Canadian novelist (died 1927)
February 13 – Emily S. Bouton, American author, editor, and educator (died 1927)
February 24 – Rosalía de Castro, Spanish Galician poet and writer (died 1885)
March 1
Ion Creangă, Romanian raconteur (died 1889)
William Dean Howells, American realist novelist (died 1920)
March 6 – Sully Prudhomme, French poet (died 1907)
April 1 – Jorge Isaacs (Ferrer), Colombian writer, politician and explorer (died 1895)
April 5 – Algernon Charles Swinburne, English poet (died 1909)
April 7 – Lou Singletary Bedford, American author and editor (unknown year of death)
June 9 – Anne Thackeray Ritchie, English novelist and essayist (died 1919)
June 28 – Petre P. Carp, Romanian politician, polemicist, and translator (died 1919)
July 13 – Mary Allen West, American writer, editor, and philanthropist (died 1892)
August 24 – Bertha Jane Grundy, English novelist (died 1912)
October 15 – Leo Königsberger, German historian of science (died 1921)
October 21 – Mary Alice Seymour, American music critic and editor (died 1897)
December 4 – Angie F. Newman, American poet, author, and editor (died 1910)
December 10 – Edward Eggleston, American novelist and historian (died 1902)
December 11 – Esther Saville Allen, American author (died 1913)
December 17 – Celia Logan, American actress and playwright (died 1904)
unknown dates
Teodor Boldur-Lățescu, Romanian journalist and publisher (died 1891)
Florence Caddy (née Tompson), English non-fiction writer (died 1923)
Anna Augusta Truitt, American essayist, philanthropist, and reformer (died 1920)

Deaths
January 29 – Alexander Pushkin, Russian poet (killed in duel, born 1799)
February 7 – Mary Robinson (Maid of Buttermere), English literary muse (born 1778)
February 12 – Ludwig Börne, German Jewish political writer and satirist (born 1786)
February 19 – Georg Büchner German dramatist, poet and author (typhus, born 1813).
March 9 – Alexandru Hrisoverghi, Moldavian writer and translator (tabes dorsalis, born 1811)
March 15 – Lukijan Mušicki, Serbian poet (born 1777)
June 12 – Carl Friedrich Ernst Frommann, German bookseller (born 1765)
June 14 – Giacomo Leopardi, Italian poet (cholera, born 1798)
September 21 – Georg Ludolf Dissen, German philologist (born 1784)
October 19 – Hendrik Doeff, Dutch travel writer (born 1764)

References

 
Years of the 19th century in literature